Ibrahima Khaliloulah Seck (born 10 August 1989) is a Senegalese professional footballer who plays as a defensive midfielder. He represented Senegal at the 2012 Summer Olympics.

References

External links

Ibrahima Seck profile at foot-national.com

Living people
1989 births
People from Thiès Region
Association football midfielders
Senegalese footballers
Senegal international footballers
Olympic footballers of Senegal
Footballers at the 2012 Summer Olympics
ASC Yakaar players
SAS Épinal players
US Créteil-Lusitanos players
AJ Auxerre players
S.K. Beveren players
K.R.C. Genk players
S.V. Zulte Waregem players
Ligue 2 players
Championnat National players
Belgian Pro League players
Senegalese expatriate footballers
Expatriate footballers in France
Expatriate footballers in Belgium
Senegalese expatriate sportspeople in France
Senegalese expatriate sportspeople in Belgium